The Gateway, also known as Alpha Gateway, is a 2017 Australian science fiction film directed by John V. Soto. The film stars Jacqueline McKenzie as a particle physicist who finds a way to access parallel universes while grieving over the loss of her husband.

Plot 

Jane Chandler is a particle physicist who's struggling to complete a teleporting machine, while enjoying a happy family life with her husband, Matt, and their two children. Matt dies in a traffic accident; soon after, Jane discovers that her teleporting machine prototype is actually sending objects to a parallel universe. She travels to a parallel reality and there finds another version of her husband, bringing him back to her own world. Soon, though, she learns that the person she has brought is not exactly like the husband she had lost.

Cast 
 Jacqueline McKenzie as Jane Chandler
 Myles Pollard as Matt Chandler
 Hayley McElhinney  as Ruth
 Shannon Berry as Samantha Chandler
 Ben Mortley as Regg
 Ryan Panizza as Jake Chandler

Reception 
Critical reception for The Gateway has been mixed. On Rotten Tomatoes the film holds a rating of 63% based on 8 reviews. Harry Windsor of The Hollywood Reporter wrote, "A nifty premise — a grieving widow brings a parallel-world version of her husband back to her own, with disastrous consequences — isn't enough to transcend a torpid screenplay".

Accolades 

 Best Feature Film at the Austin Revolution Film Festival (2017, won)
 Best Director Feature at the Austin Revolution Film Festival (2017, won)
 Best F/X Feature at the Austin Revolution Film Festival (2017, won)
 Best In Show - Feature at the Austin Revolution Film Festival (2017, won)
 Best Actress at FilmQuest (2017, nominated)
 Best Actor at FilmQuest (2017, nominated)
 Best Screenplay at FilmQuest (2017, nominated)

See also 
 Many-minds interpretation
 Many-worlds interpretation
 Multiverse

References

External links 
 

2017 films
2017 science fiction films
2017 horror films
Australian science fiction films
Films about parallel universes
Films directed by John V. Soto